Hellwig is a German surname.  Notable people with the surname include:

 Christian Hellwig, German economic theorist and macroeconomist
 Fritz Hellwig (1912–2017), German CDU politician and European Commissioner
 Helen Hellwig (1874–1960), American tennis player
 James Brian Hellwig (Warrior) (1959–2014), American professional wrestler better known as The Ultimate Warrior
 Jason Hellwig (born 1971), Australian sport administrator
 Johann Christian Ludwig Hellwig (1743–1831), German entomologist
 Judith Hellwig (1906–1993), Austrian soprano
 Maria Hellwig (1920–2010), German yodeler, popular performer
 Marcus Hellwig (born 1965), German journalist
 Margot Hellwig (born 1941), German folk singer
 Martin Hellwig (born 1949), German economist
 Monika Hellwig (1929–2005), German-born United States-based British academic, author, educator
 Otto Hellwig (1898–1962), German SS officer

See also
Helwig
Helvig (disambiguation)

German-language surnames